Mr. Aiello is a Canadian drama film, directed by Paul Tana and released in 1998. The film stars Tony Nardi as Joe Aiello, a successful Italian Canadian businessman in Montreal whose life begins to unravel when his daughter (Michèle-Barbara Pelletier), whom he has long expected to take over the company, announces her plan to drop out of business school to become a photographer.

Nardi received a Genie Award nomination for Best Actor at the 19th Genie Awards.

References

External links

1998 films
Canadian drama films
Films set in Montreal
Films shot in Montreal
Films directed by Paul Tana
French-language Canadian films
1990s Canadian films
1980s Canadian films